The Wye River plantation, or Wye Hall was the Eastern Shore of Maryland home of William Paca, a signer of the Declaration of Independence, constructed in 1765, and extensively renovated in 1790 by John Paca, with Joseph Clark as architect, at a cost of $20,000. He gained ownership of the property in Queen Anne's County, Maryland, through his wife, Mary Chew. John Beale Bordley and Margaret Chew inherited the other half of Wye Island.

William Paca is buried at the family cemetery there. The Paca residence burned down in 1879. The University of Maryland, College Park conducted archeological work there.

Wye Hall was built in the 1930s on the site of the estate of William Paca. In 1999, it was purchased by Leland C. Brendsel. A mechanic's lien was filed for work done there.

References

External links
 Aspen Wye Conference Center, The Aspen Institute
 Historic Houses - Wye Hall - Wye Island, Maryland Historical Society 
 Historic Houses - William Paca House - Queenstown, MD, Maryland Historical Society 

Houses completed in 1765
Houses completed in 1936
Plantations in Maryland
Houses in Queen Anne's County, Maryland
Archaeological sites in Queen Anne's County, Maryland
Georgian Revival architecture in Maryland
National Register of Historic Places in Queen Anne's County, Maryland
Houses on the National Register of Historic Places in Maryland
Burned houses in the United States
Buildings and structures demolished in 1879
1936 establishments in Maryland